The 1967 Cleveland Indians season was a season in American baseball. The team finished eighth in the American League with a record of 75–87, 17 games behind the Boston Red Sox.

Offseason 
 October 12, 1966: Floyd Weaver was traded by the Indians to the New York Mets for Lou Klimchock and Ernie Bowman.
 January 4, 1967: Jim Landis, Jim Weaver, and Doc Edwards were traded by the Indians to the Houston Astros for Lee Maye and Ken Retzer.

Regular season

Season standings

Record vs. opponents

Notable transactions 
 July 20, 1967: Gary Kroll was purchased by the Indians from the Houston Astros.
 September 4, 1967: Jim Kern was signed as an amateur free agent by the Indians.

Opening Day Lineup

Roster

Player stats

Batting

Starters by position 
Note: Pos = Position; G = Games played; AB = At bats; H = Hits; Avg. = Batting average; HR = Home runs; RBI = Runs batted in

Other batters 
Note: G = Games played; AB = At bats; H = Hits; Avg. = Batting average; HR = Home runs; RBI = Runs batted in

Pitching

Starting pitchers 
Note: G = Games pitched; IP = Innings pitched; W = Wins; L = Losses; ERA = Earned run average; SO = Strikeouts

Other pitchers 
Note: G = Games pitched; IP = Innings pitched; W = Wins; L = Losses; ERA = Earned run average; SO = Strikeouts

Relief pitchers 
Note: G = Games pitched; W = Wins; L = Losses; SV = Saves; ERA = Earned run average; SO = Strikeouts

Farm system

References

External links 
1967 Cleveland Indians season at Baseball Reference

Cleveland Guardians seasons
Cleveland Indians season
Cleveland